Mitromorpha dalli is a species of sea snail, a marine gastropod mollusk in the family Mitromorphidae.

Description
The shell size reaches 14 mm

Distribution
This species occurs in the Atlantic Ocean off the Azores

References

 Gofas, S.; Le Renard, J.; Bouchet, P. (2001). Mollusca, in: Costello, M.J. et al. (Ed.) (2001). European register of marine species: a check-list of the marine species in Europe and a bibliography of guides to their identification. Collection Patrimoines Naturels, 50: pp. 180–213

External links
 Dautzenberg P. & Fischer H. (1896). Dragages effectués par l'Hirondelle et par la Princesse Alice 1888–1895. 1. Mollusques Gastropodes. Mémoires de la Société Zoologique de France 9: 395–498, pl. 15–22
 

dalli
Gastropods described in 1896
Molluscs of the Azores